Bernice Johnson Reagon (born Bernice Johnson on October 4, 1942) is a song leader, composer, scholar, and social activist, who in the early 1960s was a founding member of the Student Non-violent Coordinating Committee's (SNCC) Freedom Singers in the Albany Movement in Georgia. In 1973, she founded the all-black female a cappella ensemble Sweet Honey in the Rock, based in Washington, D.C. Reagon, along with other members of the SNCC Freedom Singers, realized the power of collective singing to unify the disparate groups who began to work together in the 1964 Freedom Summer protests in the South. 
"After a song", Reagon recalled, "the differences between us were not so great. Somehow, making a song required an expression of that which was common to us all.... This music was like an instrument, like holding a tool in your hand."The Albany Singing Movement became a vital catalyst for change through music in the early 1960s protests of the Civil Rights era. Reagon devoted her life to social justice through music via recordings, activism, community singing, and scholarship.

She earned her Ph.D. from Howard University becoming a cultural historian, centered on the role of music, and is an emeritus faculty member in the History Department at The American University. She has also been a scholar-in-residence at Stanford and received an honorary doctorate of music from Berklee College of Music.

Early life and education
Bernice Johnson was the daughter of Beatrice and J.J. Johnson, a Baptist minister. She was born and raised in southwest Georgia, where church and school were an integrated part of her life, with music heavily intertwined in both of those settings. Reagon began school at the age of three when she was asked by her teacher to attend early, and she passed that first year. By the time she was in the 4th, 5th, and 6th grade, she was requested to tutor students in the 1st, 2nd, and 3rd, and she claims it was because there had only been one teacher. She entered Albany State College in 1959 (since July 1996 Albany State University) where she began her study of music.  She also became active in the local NAACP chapter and then the SNCC.  After being expelled from Albany State because of an arrest as an activist, she briefly attended Spelman College.

Later, she returned to Spelman to complete her undergraduate degree in 1970.  She received a Ford Foundation fellowship to do graduate study at Howard University, where she was awarded the Ph.D. degree in 1975.

Career

Activism
Reagon's first demonstration had been in protest against the arrest of Bertha Gober, and Blanton Hall, organized by SNCC along with the initial arrest of the two individuals, for they planned to be arrested in a discussion during a SNCC meeting. Reagon was an active participant in the Civil Rights Movement of the 1960s. She was a member of The Freedom Singers, organized by the Student Nonviolent Coordinating Committee (SNCC), for which she also served as a field secretary. Reagon explains her first encounter with SNCC as a confusion, for she did not understand the name, or its organization, but she claims that she understood that they were for freedom and full-time. The Freedom Singers were organized by Cordell Reagon in 1962. The group was the first of the civil rights singers to travel nationally. The singers realized that singing helped provide an outlet and unifier for protestors struggling with mob behavior and police brutality. Thanks to her roles with SNCC and the Freedom Singers, Reagon became a highly respected song leader during the Civil Rights Movement.

Activist James Forman later said, "I remember seeing you lift your beautiful black head, stand squarely on your feet, your lips trembling as the melodious words 'Over my head, I see freedom in the air' came forth with an urgency and a pain that brought out a sense of intense renewal and commitment of liberation. And when the call came to protest the jailings, you were up front. You led the line. Your feet hit the dirty pavement with a sureness of direction. You walked proudly onward singing 'this little light of mine, 'and the people echoed, 'shine, shine, shine.'"

Academic
In 1974, Reagon was appointed as a cultural historian in music history at the Smithsonian Institution, where she directed a program called Black American Culture in 1976, and was later a curator of music history for the National Museum of American History. Ida Jones from the Smithsonian Institution had stated, "Dr. Reagon collected photographs,sheet music, and other primary and secondary sources chronicling the development of African American sacred music tradition from its birth during the period of slavery through the creation of concert spiritual, gospel music, jazz, and the performance of protest song in the century following Emancipation." on behalf on Reagon's initial job at the museum. In 1989, she was awarded a MacArthur Fellowship. After Reagon retired in 1993, she continued to work in African American Songs of Protest as a Curator Emeritus.

She held an appointment as Distinguished Professor of History at American University (AU) in Washington DC from 1993 to 2003. Reagon has since been named Professor Emerita of History at AU, and holds the title of Curator Emeritus at the Smithsonian.

Music

Reagon claimed that she grew up in a church without a piano, so her early music was a cappella, and her first instruments were her hands and feet, and she explains, "that's the only way I can deal comfortably with creating music." When Reagon speaks about her upbringing in the musical culture, she explains that even her early schooling was heavily involved with music, not just the church. Reagon says that her teacher would lead the students outside to play games that entailed singing with their hands and feet, as well as their voices. There was also competitions among the students, and Reagon won first place as a child when running against the older students reciting Langston Hughes, "I've Known Rivers". Reagon is a specialist in African-American oral history, performance and protest traditions. She has served as music consultant, producer, composer, and performer on several award-winning film projects, notably PBS television productions such as Eyes on the Prize (1987) (in which she also appeared) and Ken Burns' The Civil War (1990). Reagon was also featured in a film, "We Shall Overcome" which was about the song and its placement in the movement, being produced by Ginger Records and made by Henry Hampton, the same creator of Eyes on The Prize. She was the conceptual producer and narrator of the Peabody Award-winning radio series, Wade in the Water, African American Sacred Music Traditions. Reagon claimed, "These days, I come as a 'songtalker', one who balances talk and song in the creation of a live performance conversation with those who gather within the sound of my voice."

Reagon joined her first and only gospel choir when she was eleven years old, which was organized by her sister at the Mt. Early Baptist Church. She and the choir would listen to the local radio station WGPC to learn black gospel for the choir to recite. As a child, the Five Blind Guys was her favorite quartet. Reagon states that her role models in terms of music are Harriet Tubman, Sojourner Truth, and Bessie Jones, because they assisted her understanding of traditional singing and the fight for justice. She also sees Deacon Reardon as an importance to her work as a historian studying African American sacred worship traditions, and she states that he impacted both her spiritual and musical development.

Reagon's work as a scholar and composer is reflected in her publications on African-American culture and history, including: a collection of essays entitled If You Don't Go, Don't Hinder Me: The African American Sacred Song Tradition (University of Nebraska Press, 2001);  We Who Believe In Freedom: Sweet Honey In The Rock: Still on the Journey, (Anchor Books, 1993); and We'll Understand It Better By And By: Pioneering African American Gospel Composers (Smithsonian Press, 1992).

Reagon has recorded several albums on Folkways Records including Folk Songs: The South, Wade in the Water, and Lest We Forget, Vol. 3: Sing for Freedom.

In 1973 Reagon founded a six-member, all-female a cappella group called Sweet Honey in the Rock. In addition to Reagon, the women in the original group were: Ysaye Maria Barnwell, Nitanju Bolade Casle, Shirley Childress Johnson, Aisha Kahil, and Carol Maillard. The only instrument they used was their voices, along with shekere and tambourine. They have toured internationally, including to Europe, Japan, Mexico, and Australia. The group's fan base is of different ethnic backgrounds, religions, and sexual orientations. Reagon's musical roots come from the rural South Baptist Church. She has advocated "music's informational and transformative power to ask" and the strong effects that music has had on the Civil Rights Movement.

Honors
In 1991 Reagon received a Candace Award from the National Coalition of 100 Black Women. 
In 1995 she received a Charles Frankel Prize for her contributions to the public understanding of the humanities. The award was presented at the White House by President Bill Clinton. 
Other notable awards include the 9th Annual Heinz Award in the Arts and Humanities given in 2003. In April 2009 Reagon received an honorary doctoral degree from the Berklee College of Music. In 2000 she won the First National Leeway Laurel Award at the Leeway Foundation in Philadelphia.
In 1996 Reagon won the Isadora Duncan Award.

Personal life
In 1963 she married Cordell Reagon, another member of The Freedom Singers. Their daughter Toshi Reagon is also a singer-songwriter.

Reagon believes that "Life's challenges are not supposed to paralyze you, they're supposed to help you discover who you are." She believes that black people have created their own world. African Americans had to use what ever territory at their disposal to create a people. And that territory was not land, it was culture. She also said there was so much done because black culture was the only thing black people could call their own. That is why she feels black culture is the most powerful in the world.

See also
 Women's music
 Black feminism
 Protest song

References

 Buffalo, Audreen. "Sweet Honey: A Cappella Activists." Ms 03 1993: 24. ProQuest. Web. 17 May 2014 .
 Dr. Bernice Johnson Reagon 1999 Folk Alliance International Lifetime Achievement Award Recipient. Performer, Dr. Bernice Johnson Reagon. Folk Alliance International, 2 Sept. 2011. Web. 12 May 2014.
 Reagon, Bernice J. "Bernice Johnson Reagon." Music: Freedom Singers. Songtalk Publishing. Web. 13 May 2014.
 "Bernice Johnson Reagon." Smithsonian Folkways. Smithsonian Institution, n.d. Web. 16 May 2014.

External links

 Official website
 SNCC Digital Gateway: Bernice Johnson Reagon, Documentary website created by the SNCC Legacy Project and Duke University, telling the story of the Student Nonviolent Coordinating Committee & grassroots organizing from the inside-out
 The Heinz Awards, Bernice Johnson Reagon profile

20th-century American women singers
African-American women singers
American folk singers
American gospel singers
Sweet Honey in the Rock members
Feminist musicians
20th-century American historians
American music historians
African-American historians
Black studies scholars
African-American activists
Activists for African-American civil rights
Student Nonviolent Coordinating Committee
MacArthur Fellows
National Humanities Medal recipients
American University faculty and staff
Howard University alumni
Spelman College alumni
Baptists from Georgia (U.S. state)
Singers from Georgia (U.S. state)
1942 births
Living people
Flying Fish Records artists
20th-century American singers